Avvakum Petrov (20 November 1620/21 – 14 April 1682) (also spelled Awakum) was an Old Believer and Russian protopope of the Kazan Cathedral on Red Square who led the opposition to Patriarch Nikon's reforms of the Russian Orthodox Church. His autobiography and letters to the tsar and other Old Believers such as Boyarynya Morozova are considered masterpieces of 17th-century Russian literature.

Life and writings
Starting in 1652 Nikon, as Patriarch of the Russian Church, initiated a wide range of reforms in Russian liturgy and theology. These reforms were intended mostly to bring the Russian Church into line with the other Eastern Orthodox Churches of Eastern Europe and the Middle East. 

Avvakum and others strongly rejected these changes. They saw them as a corruption of the Russian Church, which they considered to be the true Church of God.  The other Churches were more closely related to Constantinople in their liturgies. Avvakum argued that Constantinople fell to the Turks because of these heretical beliefs and practices. 
 

For his opposition to the reforms, Avvakum was repeatedly imprisoned. First, he was exiled to Siberia, to the city of Tobolsk, and partook in an exploration expedition under Afanasii Pashkov to the Chinese border. In 1664, after Nikon was no longer patriarch he was allowed to return to Moscow, then exiled again to Mezen, then allowed to return to Moscow again for the Church Council of 1666–67, but due to continued opposition to the reforms, he was exiled to Pustozyorsk, above the Arctic Circle, in 1667. For the last fourteen years of his life, he was imprisoned there in a pit or dugout (a sunken, log-framed hut). He and his accomplices were finally executed by being burned in a log house.Из пыточной истории России: Сожжения заживо The spot where he was burned has been commemorated by an ornate wooden cross. 

Avvakum's autobiography recounts hardships of his imprisonment and exile to the Russian Far East, the story of his friendship and fallout with the Tsar Alexis, his practice of exorcising demons and devils, and his boundless admiration for nature and other works of God. Numerous manuscript copies of the text circulated for nearly two centuries before it was first printed in 1861.

Legacy
Despite his persecution and death, groups rejecting the liturgical changes persisted. They came to be referred to as Old Believers.

English translations
The Life Written by Himself, Columbia University Press, 2021 (The Russian Library). Translated by Kenneth N. Brostrom.

References

4) P. Hunt, 	Russia’s 17th century Crisis of Modernization: The Autobiographical Saint’s Life of the Archpriest Avvakum, The Seventeenth Century,  38:1, 155-171. A Review Article of Kenneth Brostrom’s Translation of the “Life.” 

5) P. Hunt, The Theology in Avvakum’s “Life” and His Polemic with the Nikonians, The New Muscovite Cultural History, eds. M. Flier, V. Kivelson, N. S. Kollman, K. Petrone (Bloomington, In: Slavica, 2009), 125-140.

6) P. Hunt, The Holy Foolishness in the “Life” of the Archpriest Avvakum and the Problem of Innovation, Russian History, ed. L. Langer, P. Brown, 35:3-4 (2008), 275-309. 

7)Priscilla Hunt, 	Avvakum’s “Fifth Petition” to the Tsar and the Ritual Process, Slavic and East European Journal, 46.3 (2003), 483-510

External links
Life of Avvakum, academic edition with commentary (in Russian)
Avvakum's letters to the Tzar and Old Believers (pub. Paris, 1951, in Russian)
Parallel text version of Life of Avvakum 
English and Russian Articles on Avvakum by P. Hunt

1621 births
1682 deaths
People from Nizhny Novgorod Oblast
Old Believer saints
Tsardom of Russia people
17th-century Christian saints
People executed by Russia by burning
People executed for heresy